Kentucky State University (KSU, and KYSU) is a public historically black land-grant university in Frankfort, Kentucky. Founded in 1886 as the State Normal School for Colored Persons, and becoming a land-grant college in 1890, KSU is the second-oldest state-supported institution of higher learning in Kentucky. In fall 2019, total undergraduate enrollment was 2,029 with a total graduate enrollment of 142.

History
Kentucky State University was chartered in May 1886 as the State Normal School for Colored Persons, only the second state-supported institution of higher learning in Kentucky. During the euphoria of Frankfort's 1886 centennial celebration, the city donated $1,500 towards the purchase of land for a new college on a bluff overlooking Frankfort.

The new school formally opened on October 11, 1887, with three teachers, 55 students, and John H. Jackson as president. Recitation Hall (now Jackson Hall), the college's first permanent building, was erected in that year.

KSU became a land-grant college in 1890 following the passage of the Morrill Land-Grant Acts, and the departments of home economics, agriculture, and mechanics were added to the school's curriculum. The school produced its first graduating class of five students in the spring of that year. A high school was organized in 1893. This expansion continued into the 20th century in both name and program. In 1902, the name was changed to Kentucky Normal and Industrial Institute for Colored Persons. The name was changed again in 1926 to Kentucky State Industrial College for Colored Persons.

In 1929, the high school was discontinued by president Rufus B. Atwood, since students were now entering college with a high school education.  In 1938, the school was named the Kentucky State College for Negroes. The term "for Negroes" was dropped in 1952. 

The civil engineering program was started in 1942 after the NAACP threatened a lawsuit on behalf of a black student who wanted to attend the engineering program at the University of Kentucky.

Dr. Martin Luther King Jr. delivered the commencement speech at the 1957 graduation ceremonies titled, "Facing the Challenge of a New Age".

In 1960, the first white student enrolled. Kentucky State College became a university in 1972, renamed Kentucky State University.

Presidents

Academics

Students are divided into five colleges, four associate degrees, 55 undergraduate degrees, and six postgraduate programs.

 College of Agriculture, Food Science, and Sustainable Systems
 College of Arts and Sciences
 College of Business and Computer Science
 College of Professional Studies

The university also offers five liberal study degrees through the Whitney Young School (WYS) of Honors and Liberal Studies, which consists of a Honors Program, an Integrative Studies Program, and an International Studies Program. The degrees include Africana Studies and Liberal Studies.

Demographics
, Kentucky State University was host to 2,029 undergraduate students and 142 graduate students. African Americans comprised 52% of the undergraduate and 44% of the graduate student body.

Library

The Paul G. Blazer Library, constructed in 1960, houses a collection of more than 700,000 items includes extensive reference, periodical, and circulating collections of materials such as books, videos, microforms, sound recordings, and others, to aid students in their course work and research. It is named after Paul G. Blazer, a strong supporter of education who was the founder and CEO of Ashland Oil and Refining Company in Ashland, Kentucky.

Pawpaw program 

KYSU has the world's largest pawpaw (Asimina triloba) research planting. The research program was started in 1990 with the aim of developing pawpaw as a new tree-fruit crop for Kentucky. Pawpaw is the largest native fruit in the United States and has very few diseases compared to other orchard crops. KYSU is the site of the USDA National Clonal Germplasm Repository for Asimina species and the pawpaw orchards at KYSU contain over 1,700 trees. Research activities include germplasm collection and variety trials, and efforts are directed towards improving propagation, understanding fruit ripening and storage, and developing orchard management practices. Cultivation is best in hardiness zones 5-9 and trees take 7–8 years from seedling to fruiting. KYSU has created the three cultivars 'KSU-Atwood', 'KSU-Benson', and 'KSU-Chappell', with focus on better flavors, higher yields, vigorous plants, and low seed-to-pulp ratios.

Athletics

Kentucky State University teams participate as a member of the Division II Southern Intercollegiate Athletic Conference. The school's mascot are the Thorobreds and it's biggest rival is Central State University along with smaller rivalries with Tennessee State University and West Virginia State University. Men's sports include baseball, basketball, cross country, football, golf, and indoor and outdoor track and field; while women's sports include basketball, cross country, indoor and outdoor track and field, softball, and volleyball.

The men's basketball team was national champions in 1970, 1971, and 1972 at the NAIA level.

The Exum Center, the university's athletic and recreational complex, was named after William Exum, the first African-American varsity football player at the University of Wisconsin. Exum was hired as head of KSU's Physical Education department in 1949, and later made head of the Athletics department. He then became manager of the United States Track and Field teams at the 1972 and 1976 Olympics. Exum retired from KSU in 1980.

Notable alumni

Notable faculty

Wilfred Reilly, contemporary professor and published author
Frederick C. Tillis, educator, professor, musician

References

External links
 
Kentucky State Athletics website

 
Educational institutions established in 1886
Buildings and structures in Frankfort, Kentucky
Historically black universities and colleges in the United States
Land-grant universities and colleges
Liberal arts colleges in Kentucky
Universities and colleges accredited by the Southern Association of Colleges and Schools
Education in Franklin County, Kentucky
Public universities and colleges in Kentucky
Public liberal arts colleges in the United States
1886 establishments in Kentucky